25 Years Later is the sixteenth studio album by European-American pop group The Kelly Family. It was released by license to Airforce1 Records, a division of Universal Music, on 25 October 2019 throughout most of Central Europe.

Track listing
All tracks produced by Thorsten Brötzmann, Jeo Mezei, and Elephant Music.

Charts

Weekly charts

Year-end charts

Release history

References

External links
 KellyFamily.de — official site

2019 albums
The Kelly Family albums